Evgenia Kulikovskaya (Russian: Евгения Куликовская; born 21 December 1978) is a former professional tennis player from Russia.

She reached her highest singles ranking of No. 91 in June 2003. She had more success in doubles, winning four doubles titles on the WTA Tour and reaching the top 50.

A rarity among tennis players, Kulikovskaya is ambidextrous; she played with two forehands and no backhand, switching her racket hand depending on where the ball was coming from.

WTA career finals

Doubles: 10 (4 titles, 6 runner-ups)

ITF Circuit finals

Singles: 14 (8–6)

Doubles: 24 (12–12)

References

External links
 
 

1978 births
Living people
Tennis players from Moscow
Russian female tennis players
Russian State Social University alumni
20th-century Russian women
21st-century Russian women